Grama Sachivalayam (also known as Village secretariats) are secretariats setup in the Indian state of Andhra Pradesh to decentralize the administration by making services and welfare services of all government departments available at one place. Andhra Pradesh was the first state in India to launch Village Secretariats. Government of Andhra Pradesh appointed Village Volunteers to deliver services. It was launched on Gandhi Jayanti since the scheme was inspired by Mahatma Gandhi's concept of Grama Swarajya that promotes villages becoming self-sufficient, autonomous entities.

Grama Ward Sachivalayam

The Government of Andhra Pradesh has introduced a system of Village and Ward Secretariats which has never existed before.  

Door-to-door administration through village and ward secretariats

The Andhra Pradesh government has brought in a system of village and ward secretariats like nowhere else in the country so far. Chief Minister Y.S. Jagan Mohan Reddy has initiated this secretariat system with the main objective that there should be no room for corruption or discrimination and that the administration should reach out to the people. Around 500 services will be available in village and ward secretariats for about 35 government departments.

If you want a pension.. If you want a ration card. If you want house pattas.. There is a problem of drinking water supply. There are works related to civil works. Healing but.. Health but.. Revenue but.. Survey of lands. But child welfare. Whether it is dairy or poultry services. The problem will be resolved within 72 hours of filing a petition in the village secretariats.

There will no longer be a problem for any eligible person to worry that they have not received the benefits of the welfare of the government. The aim of this government is to see a smile on the face of every poor person. These village secretariats set up for the public should be well utilized by the people. This is the government of the people! The welfare of the people is the aim of this government!!

No more will the deserving people suffer from not getting the welfare benefits of the government. The goal of this government is to put a smile on the face of every poor person.  People should make good use of these village secretariats set up for the people.  This is the government of the people!  Public welfare is the goal of this government!!

History 
Establishment of Village Secretariats was one of the promises made by Y. S. Jagan Mohan Reddy during his Praja Sankalpa Yatra. Village Secretariat was first launched on 2 October 2019 on the eve of Gandhi Jayanti. The notification for the recruitment in Village/Ward Secretariats has been released on 27 July 2019. The written exam was conducted between 1 September 2019 to 8 September 2019 and the result was declared on 19 September 2019 where a total of 1,98,164 candidates were qualified. Each volunteer looks over 50 households.

As of October 2021, 15,004 Village/Ward Secretariats had been established with 2,54,832 volunteers to serve around 3.2 crore people, including home delivery of pensions and monthly provisions.

References 

Andhra Pradesh
2019 establishments in Andhra Pradesh